Moulin Rouge! The Musical is a jukebox musical with a book by John Logan. The musical is based on the 2001 film Moulin Rouge! directed by Baz Luhrmann and written by Luhrmann and Craig Pearce.

The musical premiered on July 10, 2018, at the Emerson Colonial Theatre in Boston. Moulin Rouge! opened on Broadway at the Al Hirschfeld Theatre, with previews starting on June 28, 2019, and officially opening on July 25.

At the 74th Tony Awards, Moulin Rouge! received a total of 14 nominations and won 10 awards (the most for the evening), including Best Musical.

Background
In 2002–2003, there was speculation about the possibility of a stage musical based on Moulin Rouge!, possibly in Las Vegas, but there had been no public talks in the years since. Some sources claimed in 2006 that director Baz Luhrmann had approached the leads of the film, Nicole Kidman and Ewan McGregor, to star in the potential stage version.

In 2016, it was announced that a stage musical was being developed by Global Creatures with direction by Alex Timbers.

A workshop took place in 2017, starring Aaron Tveit and Karen Olivo. The lab ran from October 30 until December 15.

Synopsis 
Moulin Rouge! is set in the Montmartre Quarter of Paris, France, during the Belle Epoque at the turn of the 20th century. The musical relates the story of Christian, a young composer, who falls in love with cabaret actress Satine, who is the star of the Moulin Rouge. Similar to the movie, the musical's score weaves together original songs with popular music, including songs that have been written in the 17 years since the film's premiere.

Act I 
The Moulin Rouge cabaret club, "where all your dreams come true," is in full swing under the direction of Harold Zidler, flanked by four dancers: Nini, Babydoll, Arabia, and La Chocolat. Christian arrives at the Moulin Rouge with fellow bohemians Henri de Toulouse-Lautrec and Santiago the Argentinean. At the same time, the money-motivated Duke of Monroth is introduced as well ("Welcome to the Moulin Rouge"). Right before Zidler introduces the Moulin Rouge's Sparkling Diamond, Christian interrupts to start a story "about love," about a woman named Satine.

The musical flashes back to Christian's arrival in 1899 to the Montmartre district of Paris from Lima, Ohio, where he meets Toulouse-Lautrec and Santiago, who are attempting to create a play with songs in it. The two are impressed by Christian's musical and songwriting talents and ask for help to get their work produced at the Moulin Rouge. The trio celebrates the Bohemian ideals of truth, beauty, freedom, and love ("Truth, Beauty, Freedom, Love").

Back at the Moulin Rouge, Zidler introduces Satine ("The Sparkling Diamond"). After Satine performs for the club, Zidler prepares for her to meet and impress the Duke of Monroth, who might invest in the Moulin Rouge and save it from financial ruin. However, Satine mistakes Christian for the Duke. Toulouse-Lautrec and Santiago distract Zidler from seeing Satine and Christian interact. While dancing and still thinking she is speaking with the Duke, Satine invites Christian to come to her dressing room in "the Elephant" outside of the club ("Shut Up and Raise Your Glass").

Arabia, Babydoll, and La Chocolat share their worries with Satine backstage about the Moulin Rouge's financial future. Nini expresses cynicism about its future, while Satine tries to maintain the group's morale. Afterward, Zidler expresses the dire straits that the club is in and stresses the importance of Satine impressing the Duke. Satine, who is concealing her worsening consumption from her colleagues, resolves to stay strong for them ("Firework").

Christian arrives in the Elephant hoping to impress Satine with his musical talent, whereas Satine is prepared to seduce him, under the impression that he is the Duke. Christian's true identity is revealed ("Your Song"). The Duke interrupts them; Christian and Satine claim they were practicing lines for a new show, Bohemian Rhapsody. With Zidler's help, Christian, Satine, Toulouse-Lautrec, and Santiago pitch the show to the Duke with an improvised plot about an evil gangster attempting to woo an ingenue who loves a poor sailor ("So Exciting! (The Pitch Song)"). The Duke decides to back the show. Zidler reminds Satine that her duty is to keep the Duke happy for the sake of the Moulin Rouge. She dismisses Christian from the Elephant. The Duke returns, and he and Satine spend the evening together ("Sympathy For The Duke").

In Montmarte, Toulouse-Lautrec shares with Christian that he fell in love with Satine many years ago, when she was living on the streets. He was impressed by her spirit but was too self-conscious to ever share his love for her over the years. He urges Christian to return to Satine and confess his love for her, insisting to him, "The greatest thing you'll ever learn is just to love and be loved in return" ("Nature Boy"). Christian goes back to Satine to convince her that they should be together. Though she initially finds this ridiculous, she eventually falls for him ("Elephant Love Medley").

Act II 
Two months later, rehearsals are underway for Bohemian Rhapsody. Christian and Satine continue seeing each other behind the scenes, and Santiago falls in love with Nini ("Backstage Romance"). As the company rehearses, tensions rise between Toulouse-Lautrec and the controlling Duke. Backstage, Nini tells Satine that she needs to be careful about her relationship with Christian and keep the Duke happy, as he once threw a vial of acid in the face of another woman who betrayed him. Satine tells Christian that their relationship endangers the show and the Moulin Rouge, but he counters by writing a secret love song to affirm their love ("Come What May").

In the Champs-Élysées neighborhood, the Duke tells Satine that he wants every part of her, including her heart. Despite Satine's protests that she does not "fit in" with the upper-class society of Paris that he inhabits, he remodels her image accordingly against her wishes ("Only Girl In A Material World"). Back in rehearsals, the Duke continues to involve himself in the show's creative aspects, to the frustration of Toulouse-Lautrec. It becomes clear that Bohemian Rhapsody is a metaphor for Christian, Satine, and the Duke, resulting in an outburst by Christian. The Duke, enraged, threatens to reconsider his investment entirely. Zidler reminds Satine that she alone can fix the dilemma with the Duke. Satine's illness worsens, but she urges her colleagues not to share that she is ill; she wants to fight to keep the Moulin Rouge alive and for the play to go on.

Toulouse-Lautrec and Santiago tell Christian he needs to forget about Satine and move on with his life. Christian retreats in frustration and drinks absinthe with them in excess, at one point, imagining Satine as The Green Fairy ("Chandelier"). Christian expresses jealousy and disgust that Satine is with the Duke instead of him, ignoring Zidler's warning that falling in love with a prostitute "always ends badly" ("El Tango de Roxanne"). At his castle, the Duke threatens Satine from being with Christian ever again, saying that he will have Christian killed if she chooses him. Christian interrupts their conversation to try to save Satine, singing their secret song. Knowing that Christian would be killed if she says otherwise, Satine tells Christian that she does not love him. Christian leaves.

Christian decides that without Satine's love, he will load a prop gun with real bullets and commit suicide on stage during the opening night of the play. Meanwhile, Satine's illness dramatically worsens. Together, she and Toulouse-Lautrec stand up to the Duke, who leaves the Moulin Rouge before the performance begins ("Crazy Rolling"). As Satine performs her part, Christian enters and asks her to face him as he turns the gun his way. Before he pulls the trigger, Satine sings their secret song, all at once saving his life and revealing to him that she loved him the entire time. After a final song together in which the two affirm their love one last time, Satine tells Christian to "tell our story," and subsequently dies in his arms ("Your Song (Reprise)"). Over a year later, Bohemian Rhapsody turns out to be a success, and Zidler regains control of the Moulin Rouge. Christian affirms that his and Satine's story will forever be told ("Come What May (Reprise)").

Productions

Boston (2018)
Moulin Rouge! was scheduled to begin preview performances on June 27, 2018, at the Emerson Colonial Theatre in Boston. The production was scheduled to officially open on July 22, 2018, and would complete its limited run on August 5, 2018. On June 6, it was announced that the Boston production would be extended by 16 additional performances, running through August 19. Construction delays in renovating the Emerson Colonial Theatre resulted in the premiere date being pushed back to July 10. The production featured choreography by Sonya Tayeh, sets by Derek McLane, costumes by Catherine Zuber, lighting design by Justin Townsend and sound design by Peter Hylenski.

Broadway (2019–present)

On November 19, 2018, it was announced that Moulin Rouge! would open on Broadway at the Al Hirschfeld Theatre. Previews on Broadway began on June 28, 2019, and opening night was July 25.

Beginning on March 12, 2020, the production was suspended due to the COVID-19 pandemic. At the time, producers of the show indicated that one of the performers had possible symptoms of the coronavirus; at least four performers contracted the virus, including stars Aaron Tveit and Danny Burstein. At the time of closing, producers said that they planned to reopen on April 13, 2020. This date would continually shift as Broadway's closure was eventually pushed to mid 2021. The production officially resumed on September 24, 2021.

On April 14, 2021, Olivo announced they would not return to the show once it reopened as a protest of the industry's silence on the allegations against producer Scott Rudin, who is not a producer of the show. In an Instagram video, Olivo stated, "Social justice is more important than being the sparkling diamond." On August 2, 2021, it was announced that Natalie Mendoza, who appeared in the original Luhrmann film as a can-can dancer, would replace Olivo in the role of Satine. Julie McBride took over as Music Director in 2021, replacing Cian McCarthy.

North American Tour (2022–present) 
On September 19, 2019, producers announced that the musical would have a ten-week engagement in Chicago at the James M. Nederlander Theatre beginning in December 2020. The tour will begin technical rehearsal at the Saenger Theatre in New Orleans in November and then continue, with casting and the full lineup of dates and cities to be announced later. Producers announced on December 16, 2020, that the tour will now kick off in March 2022 at Chicago's Nederlander Theater.  The tour officially started on March 19, 2022.

West End (2021–present) 
The musical officially debuted in the West End on January 20, 2022, with previews starting November 13, 2021. The production was housed at the Piccadilly Theatre in London. The production has been delayed from March 2021 due to the COVID-19 pandemic in the United Kingdom. Casting was announced on September 17, 2021. The production was nominated for 5 Laurence Olivier Awards in 2022, including Best New Musical.

Sahr Ngaujah, who usually plays Toulouse-Lautrec in the Broadway production, was flown over to the West End to perform with the company on December 13, 2021, as the production was hit with COVID-19 related closures.

After the announcement on September 5, 2022, the cast change happened on October 17, 2022 as planned, with  Jamie Muscato taking over the role of Christian, Melissa James playing Satine, and Matt Rixon playing Harold Zidler; other new cast members took over other roles.

Australia (2021–present)

On July 28, 2019, producer Carmen Pavlovic of Global Creatures announced that the international premiere of the musical would take place in her home country of Australia. The show will open in Melbourne's Regent Theatre in 2021. The premiere was originally announced by the Premier of Victoria, Dan Andrews. The show moves to Sydney in May 2022 but will return to Melbourne in August 2023 for another season due to the popularity of the 2021-22 season, and the earlier lockdown disruptions.

South Korea (2022–2023) 
A South Korean production is set to play in the Blue Square Sinhan Card Hall from December 20, 2022 to March 5, 2023. The Asian premiere was held in Korea. For the first time, the United States, Australia, and South Korea co-produced the costumes. Throughout the 104th performance, it recorded 90% of the total audience share.

Germany (2022–present) 

On November 6, 2022, the musical celebrated its German premiere at the Musical Dome in Cologne. Before that, previews took place from October 18, 2022. In addition, the cast performed on the German entertainment show Wetten, dass..? on November 19, 2022.

Roles and principal casts

Notable replacements

Broadway 
 Christian: Derek Klena
 Satine: Natalie Mendoza, Ashley Loren, JoJo
 Harold Zidler: Eric Anderson
 Toulouse-Lautrec: Andrè Ward
 The Duke: Declan Bennett, Dylan Paul, David Harris
 Nini: Jessica Lee Goldyn

West End 
 Christian: Jamie Muscato
 Satine: Melissa James
 Harold Zidler: Matt Rixon
 The Duke: Ben Richards
 Nini: Amy Thornton

Musical numbers 

 2018 Boston World Premiere Production

 Act I
 "Welcome to the Moulin Rouge* (Lady Marmalade†/So Fresh, So Clean/Rhythm of the Night/Because We Can (Fatboy Slim))"† – Zidler, Nini, Monroth, La Chocolat, Arabia, Baby Doll, and Company
 "Bohemian Idea Part 1* (The Sound of Music†/I Don't Want To Wait/Every Breath You Take/Never Gonna Give You Up)" – Christian
 "Bohemian Idea Part 2* (Royals/Children of the Revolution†/We Are Young)" – Christian, Toulouse-Lautrec, Santiago, and Company
 "Satine's Entrance* (Diamonds Are Forever/Diamonds Are a Girl's Best Friend†/Material Girl†/Single Ladies (Put a Ring on It))" – Satine and Company
 "Dancing with the 'Duke'* (Shut Up And Dance/Raise Your Glass/I Wanna Dance with Somebody (Who Loves Me))" – Satine, Christian, Toulouse-Lautrec, Santiago, Zidler, and Company
 "Backstage at the Moulin Rouge* (Firework)" – Satine
 "In the Elephant* (Your Song)"† – Christian and Satine
 "The Pitch*"† – Zidler, Toulouse-Lautrec, Christian, Santiago, Satine, and Monroth
 "Asking for Everything* (Sympathy For The Devil/You Can't Always Get What You Want/Gimme Shelter)" – Monroth and Satine
 "Toulouse's Story* (Nature Boy)"† – Toulouse-Lautrec and Christian
 "In the Elephant: Elephant Love Medley* (All You Need is Love†/Just One Night†/Pride (In the Name of Love)†/Can't Help Falling in Love With You/Don't Speak/I Love You Always Forever//It Ain't Me Babe/Love Hurts/Love is a Battlefield/Play the Game/Such Great Heights/Torn/Take On Me/Fidelity/What's Love Got to Do With It/Everlasting Love/Up Where We Belong†/Heroes†/Come What May†/I Will Always Love You)"† – Christian, Satine, and Company

Act II
 "Rehearsal* (Bad Romance/Tainted Love/Seven Nation Army/Toxic/Sweet Dreams (Are Made of This))" – Santiago, Nini, and Company
 "Toulouse's Studio* (Come What May)"† – Christian and Satine
 "Monroth's Proposal* (Only Girl (In the World)/Diamonds Are a Girl's Best Friend†/Material Girl†)" – Monroth, Satine, and Company
 "Backstage at the Moulin Rouge* (Shake It Out)" – Zidler, Satine, La Chocolat, Arabia, Baby Doll, and Company
 "The Green Fairy* (Chandelier)" – Christian, Santiago, Toulouse-Lautrec, and Company
 "Streets of Paris* (Roxanne)"† – Christian, Zidler, Company
 "Streets of Paris Part 2* (Crazy/Rolling in the Deep)" – Christian and Satine
 "The Show (Your Song (Reprise))" – Satine, Christian, and Company
 "Finale* (Come What May (Reprise))" – Christian and Company
 "Bows* (Lady Marmalade†/Hey Ya!/Minnie the Moocher/Bad Romance/What's Love Got to Do with It/Don't You Want Me/Crazy/Galop Infernal†/Shut Up And Dance)" – Company

† Featured in the 2001 film

*Scenes/plot points provided prior to release of song titles

 2019 Broadway Production

 Act I
 "Welcome to the Moulin Rouge! (Lady Marmalade†/Because We Can/Galop Infernal/Amores Como El Nuestro/Mr. Big Stuff/So Fresh, So Clean/Money (That's What I Want)/Ride wit Me/Burning Down The House/Walk This Way/Where It's At/Let's Dance/You Spin Me Round (Like a Record)" – Zidler, Nini, La Chocolat, Arabia, Baby Doll, Monroth, Christian, Toulouse-Lautrec, Santiago, and Company
 "Bohemian Ideas (The Sound of Music†/I Don't Want To Wait/Every Breath You Take/Never Gonna Give You Up)" – Christian
 "Truth, Beauty, Freedom, Love (Royals/Children of the Revolution†/We Are Young)" – Christian, Toulouse-Lautrec, Santiago, and Company
 "The Sparkling Diamond (Diamonds Are Forever/Diamonds Are a Girl's Best Friend†/Material Girl†/Single Ladies (Put a Ring on It)/Brick House/My Lovin' (You're Never Gonna Get It)/Jungle Boogie/Diamonds)" – Satine and Company
 "Shut Up and Raise Your Glass (Shut Up And Dance/Raise Your Glass/I Wanna Dance with Somebody (Who Loves Me))" – Satine, Christian, Toulouse, Santiago, and Company
 "Firework" – Satine
 "Your Song"† – Christian and Satine
 "So Exciting! (The Pitch Song) (Complainte de la Butte/Milord/La Vie en rose/Habanera (L'amour est un oiseau rebelle)/Galop Infernal†)"– Zidler, Toulouse-Lautrec, Christian, Santiago, Satine, and Monroth
 "Sympathy For The Duke (Sympathy For The Devil/You Can't Always Get What You Want/Gimme Shelter)" – Monroth, Satine, and Company
 "Nature Boy"† – Toulouse-Lautrec and Christian
 "Elephant Love Medley (One More Night†/Pride (In the Name of Love)†/Play the Game/Love Hurts/Take On Me/It Ain't Me Babe/I Love You Always Forever/Love is a Battlefield/Don't Speak/Everlasting Love/What's Love Got To Do with It/Fidelity/Can't Help Falling In Love/Torn/Such Great Heights/Up Where We Belong†/Heroes†/Your Song/I Will Always Love You)"† – Christian, Satine, and Company

Act II
 "Backstage Romance (Bad Romance/Tainted Love/Seven Nation Army/Toxic/Sweet Dreams (Are Made of This))" – Santiago, Nini, and Company
 "Come What May"† – Christian and Satine
 "Only Girl In A Material World (Only Girl (In the World)/Diamonds Are a Girl's Best Friend†/Material Girl†)" – Monroth, Satine, and Company
 "Chandelier" – Zidler, Christian, Santiago, Toulouse-Lautrec, La Chocolat, Arabia, Baby Doll, and Company
 "El Tango de Roxanne (Roxanne/:es:Tanguera/Chandelier)"† – Christian and Company
 "Crazy Rolling (Crazy/Rolling in the Deep)" – Christian, Satine, and Company
 "Your Song (Reprise) (Come What May/Your Song/Heroes)" – Satine, Christian, and Company
 "Finale (Come What May) (Come What May/Lady Marmalade)" – Christian and Company
 "More More More! (Lady Marmalade†/Hey Ya!/Because We Can/Bad Romance/What's Love Got to Do with It/Crazy/Galop Infernal†)" – Zidler and Company

† Featured in the 2001 film

Cast recording 
Moulin Rouge! The Musical (Original Broadway Cast Recording) was released digitally on August 30, 2019. A CD version was released on October 25, 2019 and a vinyl version on December 13, 2019.

Charts

Critical response 
The Broadway production of the musical received mixed to positive reviews.

In a rave review, theater critic John Simon wrote, "If you like splash, Moulin Rouge! is the show for you. Even more than the Baz Luhrmann movie, on which the musical is loosely based, it can hold your wonderment without abate from start to finish. ... This is a show to make the young feel mature, and the old blissfully young again." It was named a Critic's Pick by The New York Times with Ben Brantley calling it "a cloud-surfing, natural high of a production."

Diane Snyder of The Telegraph praised the scenic design, choreography, and costume and wrote that "Moulin Rouge! may not have the depth of some of Broadway's great musicals... [but] it's fun, tuneful and entertaining, and that's exactly what we need right now." Mashable's Erin Strecker said that "This is the best of what a jukebox musical can be; a thrilling burst of color and chorus and nostalgia and bold reimagining." Adam Feldman leaned positive as he called the show "an extravagant Broadway megamix," commenting that it "looks and feels expensive." Some critics praised the changes made from the film. Patrick Ryan of USA Today commented that "the use of recent pop songs actually improves upon the source material, helping flesh out characters' motivations and deepen the central romance." David Cote of The New York Observer wrote, "Logan's tweaks to the original screenplay are neat and necessary."

In a mixed review, Rolling Stone'''s Brittany Spanos criticized the musical's disjointedness but praised the high-energy parts of the show. In another mixed review, Charles Isherwood of Broadway News summed up that "The resulting show is all flash, splash and megawatt musical numbers, nimbly if not entirely masking a fairly hollow and certainly hoary emotional core." Alexis Soloski of The Guardian also commented on the leads' lack of chemistry, but mentioned that the show delivers when it comes to "dazzle and excitement," praising its choreography, set, energy, and costume.

 Box office 
According to Playbill, Moulin Rouge! The Musical grossed around $2.2 million for the week ending of October 13, 2019. On May 3, 2022, it was reported that Moulin Rouge! The Musical became the fifth highest grossing Broadway shows with $1.4 million box office in the week. As of September 11, 2022, the musical grossed around $135.5 million with 371,285 attendance and 260 performance.

Awards and nominations

 2018 Boston production 

 Original Broadway production 

 Original West End production 

References

External links
 
 
 Moulin Rouge! The Musical at Broadway.com''
  (archive)

2018 musicals
Jukebox musicals
Musicals based on films
Revues
Cultural depictions of Henri de Toulouse-Lautrec
Plays set in the 19th century
Plays set in France
Moulin Rouge!
Tony Award for Best Musical
Tony Award-winning musicals